WMVK-LP (107.3 FM) is a non-commercial radio station licensed to serve Perryville, Maryland.  The station is owned by the Maryland Transit Administration and licensed to the State of Maryland Department of Transportation. It airs a Smooth Jazz format which includes easy listening music, transit information, and drive-time commuter reports.

The station was assigned the WMVK-LP call letters by the Federal Communications Commission on April 3, 2003.

The station simulcasts the programming from its sister station, WTTZ-LP which is based in the Baltimore Metro Area.

References

External links
 

MVK-LP
MVK-LP
Cecil County, Maryland
Perryville, Maryland